Kéibly is a village in western Ivory Coast. It is in the sub-prefecture of Zagné, Taï Department, Cavally Region, Montagnes District.

Kéibly was a commune until March 2012, when it became one of 1126 communes nationwide that were abolished.

Notes

Former communes of Ivory Coast
Populated places in Montagnes District
Populated places in Cavally Region